Higher Self is the third album by Japanese singer Kyosuke Himuro. Reached number one on Oricon Albums Chart.

Track listing
Crime of Love
Black-List
Velvet Rose
Psychic Baby
Maximum 100 no Yūutsu 
Wild at Night
Stormy Night
Climax
Cabaret in the Heaven
Moon
Jealousy wo Nemurasete (Remix Version) 
Lover's Day -Solitude-

References

Kyosuke Himuro albums
1991 albums